Stolzenberg is a surname. Notable people with the surname include:

Daniel Stolz von Stolzenberg (1600–1660), Bohemian physician
Leon Stolzenberg (1895–1974), American chess player
Lisa Stolzenberg, American criminologist
Mark Stolzenberg, American actor, screenwriter, and producer
Stuart Stolzenberg, Australian photographer 

Stolzenberg is also the former German name for the town of Różanki,_Lubusz_Voivodeship, in western Poland